Christina Plate (born 21 April 1965 in Berlin) is a German actress. She has appeared in many German films, TV films and series.

Plate won a Bambi in 1988. In 2009, she married German television presenter Oliver Geissen. Together they have one son.

Selected filmography
 Manni, der Libero (1982, TV series), as Bettina Hohmann
 Eine Klasse für sich (1984–1985, TV series), as Irmgard Eyssen
 Praxis Bülowbogen (1987–1994, TV series), as Sigi Kaul
 Ein Fall für zwei: Wer Gewalt sät (1988, TV series episode), as Julia Remmler
  (1989), as Egon
 Molle mit Korn (1989, TV series), as Agathe
 Tatort: Finale am Rothenbaum (1991, TV series episode), as Bettina Richards
 Tatort: Bienzle und der Biedermann (1992, TV series episode), as Cordula Stricker
 Derrick: Das Floß (1994, TV series episode), as Anna Bender
 Derrick: Teestunde mit einer Mörderin? (1995, TV series episode), as Isabel Bruhns
 Zoff und Zärtlichkeit (1995, TV series), as Eva Jacobson
 Florida Lady (1996, TV series), as Iris Tecklenburg
 Tatort: Schneefieber (1996, TV series episode), as Manu Münter
 Der Mond scheint auch für Untermieter  (1996–1997, TV series), as Susanne Wellinghaus
 Rosamunde Pilcher: Klippen der Liebe (1999, TV film), as April
 Der kleine Mönch (2002–2003, TV series), as Ursula Foges
 The Old Fox: Kein Tag zum Sterben (2002, TV series episode), as Monika John
 The Old Fox: Späte Rache (2003, TV series episode), as Nina Kampermann
 The Old Fox: Alle Hoffnung begraben (2004, TV series episode), as Jutta Dubinsky
 Familie Dr. Kleist (2004–2011, TV series), as Marlene Kleist
 The Old Fox: Schweigegeld (2004, TV series episode), as Simone Walldorf
 Utta Danella: Tanz auf dem Regenbogen (2007, TV film), as Sylvie van Helsing
 Cologne P.D. (2015–2016, TV series), as Nina Jacobs

References

External links

Living people
German film actresses
German television actresses
20th-century German actresses
21st-century German actresses
1965 births
Actresses from Berlin